USNS Pililaau (T-AKR 304) is the fifth  built by the Avondale Shipyards of New Orleans, Louisiana for the United States Navy. Pililaau is named after Private first class Herbert K. Pililaau, a Medal of Honor recipient.

Service history
Pililaau is one of 19 and is part of the 16 ships in Military Sealift Command's Sealift Program Office. It is currently owned by the government, but run under a contract by a private company. The ship is kept in operational ready status (ROS-4) at all times. The ship is designed to be a multifunctional part of any fleet. It is capable of general cargo transportation, and also as a means to load and unload ships without the benefit of deep draft-capable, fixed port facilities. The ship was used throughout the Iraq and Afghanistan wars to transfer equipment to friendly ports in Europe to be brought into the combat theater.

The ship carries no fixed guns but may support a detachment of security forces for defense.

References

External links

 USNS Frank PILILAAU Navy site
 USNS PILILAAU 
 NavSource Online USNS Pililaau (T-AKR-304)

 

Ships built in Bridge City, Louisiana
2000 ships
Auxiliary ships of the United States